The 17th Alabama Infantry Regiment was an infantry regiment that served in the Confederate Army during the American Civil War.

Service
The 17th Alabama Infantry Regiment was mustered in at Montgomery, Alabama in August 1861 under Colonel Thomas H. Watts.  Watts organized the 17th Infantry and led it at Pensacola and Corinth, but resigned as its colonel to serve as the Confederacy's attorney general in President Jefferson Davis' cabinet.

The regiment surrendered at Greensboro, North Carolina in April 1865.

Total strength and casualties
When regiment was organized at Montgomery, Alabama, it took 900 men hailing from Coosa, Lowndes, Montgomery, Pike, Randolph, Monroe, Butler, and Russell counties. 

The regiment sustained particularly heavy losses in 1864 after it joined the Army of Tennessee.

Commanders
Col. Thomas H. Watts
Col. Virgil S. Murphy

See also
Alabama Civil War Confederate Units
Alabama in the American Civil War

References

Further reading
Brewer, Willis. Brief Historical Sketches of Military Organizations Raised in Alabama during the Civil War. Montgomery, Al.:  Alabama Civil War Centennial Commission, 1962, pp. 616–618. (Brief history and roster of officers). 
Confederate Military History, Extended Edition. Vol. 8: Alabama. Wilmington, NC.:  Broadfoot, 1987, pp. 111–113.  (Brief unit history).
Crute, Joseph H., Jr.  Units of the Confederate States Army. Midlothian, VA: Derwent Books, 1987, p. 16.  (Concise summary of the regiment's service).
Sifakis, Stewart. Compendium of the Confederate Armies: Alabama. New York: Facts on File, 1992, pp. 80–81.  (Unit organizational history).
Thompson, Illene D. and Wilbur E. The Seventeenth Alabama Infantry: A Regimental History and Roster. Bowie, MD:  Heritage, 2001.

External links
State of Alabama Archives page for 17th Alabama Infantry Regiment
Roster of the Company C, 17th Alabama Infantry Regiment

Units and formations of the Confederate States Army from Alabama
1861 establishments in Alabama
Military units and formations established in 1861